One ship and one future ship of the Royal Canadian Navy have been named HMCS Protecteur;

 , a replenishment oiler in service from 1969 to 2015
 HMCS Protecteur, the planned replacement for the first vessel. The ship was laid down on 16 January 2020.

Battle honours

Gulf and Kuwait
Arabian Sea

References

 Government of Canada Ships' Histories - HMCS Protecteur

See also
 
 

Royal Canadian Navy ship names